The following is a list of animated films in the public domain in the United States for which there is a source to verify its status as public domain under the terms of U.S. copyright law.
For more information, see List of films in the public domain in the United States. Films published before  are not included because all such films are in the public domain (Note: while the film in and of itself may be in the public domain, the original versions may incorporate elements that remain under a separate copyright).

Some shorts listed here were produced for the United States government such as the Private Snafu series. Because they were produced for the U.S. government, they automatically fall into the public domain.

Metro-Goldwyn-Mayer
To Spring (1936)
Jerky Turkey (1945)
Doggone Tired (1949)

Warner Bros. Pictures
The films listed below were last owned by Warner Bros. Pictures when the time for their renewals came up.

Source: Film Superlist: Motion Pictures in the U.S. Public Domain

Looney Tunes

Sinkin' in the Bathtub (1930)
Congo Jazz (1930)
Hold Anything (1930)
Booze Hangs High, The (1930)
Box Car Blues (1930)
Big Man from the North (1931)
Ain't Nature Grand! (1931)
Ups 'n Downs (1931)
Dumb Patrol (1931)
Yodeling Yokels (1931)
Bosko's Holiday (1931)
The Tree's Knees (1931)
Bosko Shipwrecked! (1931)
Bosko the Doughboy (1931)
Bosko's Soda Fountain (1931)
Bosko's Fox Hunt (1931)
Bosko at the Zoo (1932)
Battling Bosko (1932)
Big-Hearted Bosko (1932)
Bosko's Party (1932)
Bosko and Bruno (1932)
Bosko's Dog Race (1932)
Bosko at the Beach (1932)
Bosko and Honey (1932)
Bosko's Store (1932)
Bosko the Lumberjack (1932)
Hollywood Capers (1935)
Boom Boom (1936)
Westward Whoa (1936)
Porky's Railroad (1937)
Get Rich Quick Porky (1937)
Porky's Garden (1937)
Ali-Baba Bound (1940)
Timid Toreador, The (1940)
Haunted Mouse, The (1941)
Joe Glow the Firefly (1941)
Porky's Bear Facts (1941)
Porky's Preview (1941)
Porky's Ant (1941)
Coy Decoy, A (1941)
Porky's Prize Pony (1941)
Meet John Doughboy (1941)
We, the Animals Squeak! (1941)
Henpecked Duck, The (1941)
Notes to You (1941)
Robinson Crusoe Jr. (1941)
Porky's Midnight Matinee (1941)
Porky's Pooch (1941)
Porky's Pastry Pirates (1942)
Who's Who in the Zoo (1942)
Porky's Cafe (1942)
Saps in Chaps (1942)
Daffy's Southern Exposure (1942)
Nutty News (1942)
Hobby Horse-Laffs (1942)
Gopher Goofy (1942)
Wacky Blackout (1942)
Ducktators, The (1942)
Eatin' on the Cuff (or The Moth Who Came to Dinner) (1942)
Impatient Patient, The (1942)
Daffy Duckaroo, The (1942)
Confusions of a Nutzy Spy (1943)
Hop and Go (1943)
Tokio Jokio (1943)
Porky Pig's Feat (1943)
Scrap Happy Daffy (1943)
Puss n' Booty (1943)

Merrie Melodies

Lady, Play Your Mandolin! (1931)

United Artists
The films listed below were last owned by United Artists when the time for their renewals came up.

Source: Film Superlist: Motion Pictures in the U.S. Public Domain

Merrie Melodies

Smile, Darn Ya, Smile! (1931)
One More Time (1931)
You Don't Know What You're Doin'! (1931)
Hittin' the Trail for Hallelujah Land (1931)
Red-Headed Baby (1931)
Pagan Moon (1932)
Freddy the Freshman (1932)
Crosby, Columbo, and Vallee (1932)
Goopy Geer (1932)
It's Got Me Again! (1932)
Moonlight for Two (1932)
Queen Was in the Parlor, The (1932)
I Love a Parade (1932)
You're Too Careless With Your Kisses (1932)
I Wish I Had Wings (1932)
Great Big Bunch of You, A (1932)
Three's a Crowd (1932)
Shanty Where Santy Claus Lives, The (1933)
I Wanna Be a Sailor (1937)
Jungle Jitters (1938)
Have You Got Any Castles? (1938)
Hamateur Night (1939)
Robin Hood Makes Good (1939)
Gold Rush Daze (1939)
Day at the Zoo, A (1939)
Prest-O Change-O (1939)
Bars and Stripes Forever (1939)
Daffy Duck and the Dinosaur (1939)
Early Worm Gets the Bird, The (1940)
Farm Frolics (1941)
Sport Chumpions (1941)
All This and Rabbit Stew (1941)
Rookie Revue (1941)
Wabbit Who Came to Supper, The (1942)
Wacky Wabbit, The (1942)
Foney Fables (1942)
Fresh Hare (1942)
Fox Pop (1942)
Dover Boys at Pimento University (or The Rivals of Roquefort Hall), The (1942)
Sheepish Wolf, The (1942)
Tale of Two Kitties, A (1942)
Ding Dog Daddy (1942)
Case of the Missing Hare (1942)
Pigs in a Polka (1943)
Fifth-Column Mouse, The (1943)
Wackiki Wabbit (1943)
Corny Concerto, A (1943)
Falling Hare (1943)
Inki and the Minah Bird (1943)

Popeye the Sailor cartoons

I'm in the Army Now (1936)
Little Swee'Pea (1936)
Popeye the Sailor Meets Sindbad the Sailor (1936) 
Paneless Window Washer, The (1937) 
Popeye the Sailor Meets Ali Baba's Forty Thieves (1937)
I Never Changes My Altitude (1937)
A Date to Skate (1938)
Aladdin and His Wonderful Lamp (1939)
Customers Wanted (1939)
Me Musical Nephews (1942)
Shuteye Popeye (1952)
Big Bad Sindbad (1952)
Ancient Fistory (1953)
Floor Flusher (1954)
Popeye's 20th Anniversary (1954)
Taxi-Turvy (1954)
Bride and Gloom (1954)
Greek Mirthology (1954)
Fright to the Finish (1954)
Private Eye Popeye (1954)
Gopher Spinach (1954)
Cookin' with Gags (1955)
Popeye for President (1956)
Out to Punch (1956)
Assault and Flattery (1956)
Insect to Injury (1956)
Parlez Vous Woo (1956)
I Don't Scare (1956)
A Haul in One (1956)
Nearlyweds (1957)
The Crystal Brawl (1957)
Patriotic Popeye (1957)
Spree Lunch (1957)
Spooky Swabs (1957)

Looney Tunes

To Duck or Not to Duck (1943)
Yankee Doodle Daffy (1943)
Daffy - The Commando (1943)

Universal Pictures

The films listed below were last owned by Universal Pictures when the time for their renewals came up.

Oswald the Lucky Rabbit
Every short from 1927 has entered the public domain as of 2023.
South Pole Flight (1928)
Bull-Oney (1928)
Africa (1930)
The Bandmaster (1931)
Mechanical Man (1932)
Making Good (1932)
The Plumber (1933)
The Quail Hunt (1935)
Beach Combers (1936)

Woody Woodpecker
Pantry Panic (1941)

Miscellaneous

All 1949 and 1953 Coca-Cola advertisements
All advertisements made for companies such as Albers, Autolite, Carnation, Interstate Bakeries Corporation and Kellogg's
House of Magic (1937)
Boy Meets Dog (1938)
Silly Superstition (1939)
The Amazing Recovery of Inbad the Ailer (1939)
Scrub Me Mama with a Boogie Beat (1941)
Gremlin Mr. N'Tane (1944)
The Enemy Bacteria (1945)
The Story of Human Energy (1947)
Blood is Needed (1953)

National Periodical Publications
The films listed below were last owned by National Periodical Publications when the time for their renewals came up.

Superman cartoon series

Superman (1941)
Mechanical Monsters, The (1941)
Arctic Giant, The (1942)
Billion Dollar Limited (1942)
Bulleteers, The (1942)
Destruction Inc. (1942)
Electric Earthquake (1942)
Eleventh Hour (1942)
Japoteurs (1942)
Magnetic Telescope, The (1942)
Showdown (1942)
Terror on the Midway (1942)
Volcano (1942)
Jungle Drums (1943)
Mummy Strikes, The (1943)
Secret Agent (1943)
Underground World, The (1943)

National Telefilm Associates

Gulliver's Travels (film)

Harvey Films

Kartunes
 Hysterical History (1953)

Noveltoons
 The Seapreme Court (1954; featuring Little Audrey)
 Crazytown (1954)
 Pest Pupil (1957; featuring Baby Huey)
 Dawg Gone (1958; featuring Little Audrey)

Casper the Friendly Ghost
 The Friendly Ghost
 Boo Moon (1954)
 Spooking About Africa (1957)

Walt Disney Productions

The Mad Doctor (1933) 
Susie the Little Blue Coupe (1952)

U.S. Government films
The films listed below are works of the United States government, which makes them public domain.

Source: Film Superlist: Motion Pictures in the U.S. Public Domain

Private Snafu (Warner Bros.)

Booby Traps
Censored
The Chow Hound
Coming! Snafu!
Fighting Tools
Gas
Going Home
Gripes
The Home Front
Hot Spot
In the Aleutians
The Infantry Blues
The Goldbrick
It's Murder She Says
A Lecture on Camouflage
Private Snafu vs. Malaria Mike
Rumors
Secrets of the Caribbean
Snafuperman
Spies
Target: Snafu
The Three Brothers
Operation: Snafu
Outpost
Pay Day
No Buddy Atoll

Mr. Hook (Warner Bros.)
The Good Egg
The Return of Mr. Hook
Tokyo Woes

Other government films
Warner Bros.
90 Day Wondering
Any Bonds Today?
Drafty, Isn't It?
Hitch in Time, A
Point Rationing of Foods
So Much for So Little
Walter Lantz Productions
Take Heed Mr. Tojo (1943)
All 1943-1944 Fred Brunish stop-motion instructional films for the U.S. Navy
Walt Disney Productions
The Spirit of '43 (1943)
United Pictures of America (UPA)
Hell-Bent for Election [allegorical campaign film]
Others
200 (1975) - made by Vincent Collins for the United States Information Agency

Others
Bosko the Talk-Ink Kid (1929) - the animated/live action short film by Harman-Ising Productions that would spawn the Looney Tunes and Merrie Melodies series
Man Alive! (1952) - produced by UPA for the American Cancer Society
Look Who's Driving (1954) - produced by UPA for Aetna
You Can Handle It (1958) - produced by Cal Dunn Studios for the National Safety Council
Moonbird (1959)
Calvin and the Colonel
Rudolph the Red-Nosed Reindeer (1964) - copyright status uncertain, see Rudolph the Red-Nosed Reindeer copyright issues

Nina Paley's Sita Sings the Blues (2008)

References 

Lists of American animated films
Public domain in the United States
Public domain in the United States